Alpha Man: The Brotherhood of MLK is a television documentary film that reveals the story of Martin Luther King Jr.’s fraternity days as a member of Alpha Phi Alpha fraternity. Produced by Rainforest Films, the half-hour special originally aired August 28, 2011 on BET. The documentary special was scheduled to debut on the same day as the much-anticipated official dedication of the Martin Luther King, Jr. Memorial statue on the National Mall in Washington, D.C. The statue's dedication, which was to coincide with the 48th anniversary of the March on Washington and King’s "Dream" speech, was postponed until October 16, 2011 due to Hurricane Irene.

Synopsis
Alpha Man: The Brotherhood of MLK tells the little-known story of Martin Luther King Jr.'s fraternity days as a member of the country's first collegiate black fraternity, Alpha Phi Alpha. Hosted and narrated by Hill Harper, the film gives first hand accounts by King's associates and follows King from a 23-year-old divinity student in Boston and 1952 Alpha pledgee to Nobel Prize-winner and leading civil rights pioneer. The documentary also includes never been heard excerpts from King speaking at the 50th Anniversary of the Alpha Phi Alpha Fraternity, the only time he spoke at an Alpha convention.

See also
 Civil rights movement in popular culture

References

External links
 
 Portfolio at Rob-Hardy.com

Documentary films about African Americans
American documentary television films
African-American films
Rainforest Films films
2011 television films
2011 films
BET original programming
Films about Martin Luther King Jr.
2010s English-language films
2010s American films